The Fürstenzug (English: Procession of Princes) in Dresden, Germany, is a large mural of a mounted procession of the rulers of Saxony. It was originally painted between 1871 and 1876 to celebrate the 800th anniversary of the Wettin Dynasty, Saxony's ruling family. In order to make the work weatherproof, it was replaced with approximately 23,000 Meissen porcelain tiles between 1904 and 1907. The mural displays the ancestral portraits of the 35 margraves, electors, dukes and kings of the House of Wettin between 1127 and 1904. 

The Fürstenzug is located on the outer wall of the Stallhof (Stables Courtyard) of Dresden Castle.

History 
By 1589, the outer wall of the recently built Stallhof (Stables Courtyard) of the Dresden Castle was already decorated with a fresco.

For the upcoming 800th anniversary of the House of Wettin in 1889, another stucco version of a large-scale mural was commissioned. It was painted by the artist Wilhelm Walther between 1871 and 1876. Since the picture rapidly deteriorated, it was replaced with about 23,000 Meissen porcelain tiles between 1904 and 1907. The mural depicts the 35 Saxon margraves, electors, dukes and kings from Conrad, Margrave of Meissen, who ruled in the 12th century, to George of Saxony who was king for only two years in the 20th century. The only ones missing are Heinrich I von Eilenburg (c. 1089) and the last king of Saxony, Frederick Augustus III, who ruled from 1904 to 1918. Also shown are 59 scientists, artisans, craftsmen, children and farmers.

Only minimal damage to the tiles resulted from the February 13, 1945 bombing of Dresden.

Panorama

Shown noblemen 

The 35 noblemen,  Margraves, Electors, Dukes and Kings, are shown on horseback while foot soldiers and other people accompany them. The name of each ruler is inscribed below his image. Everyone depicted wears contemporary clothing.

Conrad, Margrave of Meissen (1127–1156)
Otto II, Margrave of Meissen (1156–1190)
Albert, Margrave of Meissen (1190–1195)
Dietrich I, Margrave of Meissen (1195–1221)
Henry III, Margrave of Meissen (1221–1288)
Albert II, Margrave of Meissen (1288–1307)
Frederick I, Margrave of Meissen (1307–1324)
Frederick II, Margrave of Meissen (1324–1349)
Frederick III, Landgrave of Thuringia (1349–1381)
Frederick I, Elector of Saxony (1381–1428)
Frederick II, Elector of Saxony (1428–1464)
Ernest, Elector of Saxony (1464–1486)
Albert III, Duke of Saxony (1486–1500)
Frederick III, Elector of Saxony (1486–1525)
John, Elector of Saxony (1525–1532)
John Frederick I, Elector of Saxony (1532–1547)
George, Duke of Saxony (1500–1539)
Henry IV, Duke of Saxony (1539–1541)
Maurice, Elector of Saxony (1547–1553)
Augustus, Elector of Saxony (1553–1586)
Christian I, Elector of Saxony (1586–1591)
Christian II, Elector of Saxony (1591–1611)
John George I, Elector of Saxony (1611–1656)
John George II, Elector of Saxony (1656–1680)
John George III, Elector of Saxony (1680–1691)
John George IV, Elector of Saxony (1691–1694)
Augustus II the Strong (1694–1733)
Augustus III of Poland (1733–1763)
Frederick Christian, Elector of Saxony (1763)
Frederick Augustus I of Saxony (1763–1827)
Anthony of Saxony (1827–1836)
Frederick Augustus II of Saxony (1836–1854)
John of Saxony (1854–1873)
Albert of Saxony (1873–1902)
George of Saxony (1902–1904)

Dimensions 
Due to 18 windows in the upper part, the tile area comprises only 968 square meters. Hence, approximately 23,000 tiles are placed on the wall.

See also 
 List of rulers of Saxony

Further reading 
 Reinhard Delau: Der Fürstenzug in Dresden. Edition Sächsische Zeitung, Dresden 2005, 
 Karlheinz Blaschke: Der Fürstenzug zu Dresden. Urania, Freiburg 1991, 
 Clemens Freiherr von Hausen: Der Fürstenzug auf dem Sgraffito-Fries am Königlichen Schlosse zu Dresden. Dresden 1903

Notes and references

External links 

 High resolution image of the Fürstenzug at Gigapan.org

Culture in Dresden
Tourist attractions in Dresden
Murals